Károly Escher (21 October 1890 - 16 February 1966) was a Hungarian photographer. Escher was born in Szekszárd, in the Tolna region of Hungary. He worked as a cinematographer on news reels during the briefly lived Hungarian Soviet Republic. Later he worked for the newspaper Pesti Napló during the 1930s and 1940s. He died at age 75 in Budapest in 1966.

Filmography
Mackó úr kalandjai (1920)
Masamód (1920) ... Masa's Way
A Szerelem mindent legyöz (1920)

Awards
 1938 Venice Biennale Silver medal.

External links
 Article in The Guardian with some biographical information.
 The Red News-Reel of the Tanácsköztársaság: History Dream and Cinema Imagination by Bruno De Marchi

1890 births
1966 deaths
Hungarian photographers
Hungarian cinematographers
People from Szekszárd